Undina is a genus of prehistoric coelacanth, lobe-finned fish, which lived from the Triassic period to the Cretaceous period.

Species
 Undina acutidens Reis, 1888
 Undina barroviensis
 Undina gulo (synonym: Holophagus gulo) (type species)
 Undina penicillata (Munster)
 Undina? picena (Costa, 1862)
 Undina purbeckensis

Distribution
Species of this genus have been found in Cretaceous of Spain, in Jurassic of Germany, Turkey and the United Kingdom and in Triassic of Italy.

References

The Paleobiology Database
Paul H. LAMBERS redescription of the coelacanth Macropoma willemoesii VETTER from the lithographic limestone of Solnhofen (Upper Jurassic, Bavaria)
Solnhofen

Prehistoric lobe-finned fish genera
Jurassic fish of Europe
Latimeriidae
Fossil taxa described in 1834